Outbreak is the second studio album by Maine hardcore punk band Outbreak. It was released in 2009 on Think Fast! Records.

Track listing

References

2009 albums
Outbreak (band) albums